Gruesome School Trip (lit. "The Horror Bus") is a 2005 Dutch film, based on the novel series De Griezelbus by Paul van Loon.

The film received a Golden Film award for having been viewed by over 100,000 people.

Plot
Gruesome School Trip follows Onnoval, an awkward 11-year-old who feels uncomfortable around his fellow classmates. He believes that if he loses control, by becoming too excited or getting into a fight, he will turn into a werewolf. Onnoval keeps his worry a secret, even from his school sweetheart, Liselore.

After a particularly humiliating incident at school where the bully Gino grabs his love poem to Lislore and tears it to pieces, Onnoval writes a horror story where he takes revenge on his classmates.

The story is a way for Onnoval to cope with his humiliation at school. However, fantasy soon turns to frightening reality when Ferluci takes possession of Onnoval's story and makes a deal with the devil to make it come true.

If Onnoval does not rewrite the story immediately, the planned school trip to the Horror Park will end in disaster. But in order to rewrite it, he must first get his story back from Ferluci.

References

External links

www.goudenfilm.nl

2005 films
2000s Dutch-language films
Films based on horror novels
Dutch horror films
Films directed by Pieter Kuijpers